"Istanbul" is a song by English singer Morrissey. It is the fourth track on his World Peace Is None of Your Business album and was released as the second single off the album via digital download on 20 May 2014, through Harvest and Capitol Records.

Due to changes in global music consumption, the physical versions of the first four singles from this album were released together as one 10" vinyl.

Joe Chiccarelli, the album's producer, stated that "Morrissey wanted to evoke the feeling of the hectic and chaotic streets of the city of Istanbul, so he used a cigar-box guitar, a lap steel guitar and a complicated and bussy drum rhythm, plus an actual gong as percussion, as well as vocal samples from a field recording taken in the streets of Istanbul by guitarist Jesse Tobias."

Music video
The accompanying music video, directed by Natalie Johns, was also released on 20 May 2014. As with the previous single, it features Morrissey performing the song in spoken word.

Track listing
Digital download
 "Istanbul" – 4:40

Personnel
 Morrissey – vocals

Additional musicians
 Boz Boorer – guitar 
 Jesse Tobias – guitar
 Solomon Walker – bass
 Matthew Walker – drums
 Gustavo Manzur – keyboards

Technical personnel
 Joe Chiccarelli – production

References

2014 songs
2014 singles
Morrissey songs
Harvest Records singles
Capitol Records singles
Songs about cities
Songs about Turkey
Culture in Istanbul
Songs written by Boz Boorer